Next to You (Spanish: A tu lado) is a 2018 Peruvian romantic comedy film directed by Martin Casapía Casanova and written by Samuel del Amor. Starring Alessandra Fuller and Andrés Vílchez. It premiered on March 1, 2018 in Peruvian theaters.

Synopsis 
Paz, a young girl, immersed in her sadness, is invited to Punta Cana by her uncle Martín, who is a manager at one of the most prestigious hotels in the area, there she will meet Edú who works as a lifeguard at the hotel, this love story will take both characters on a hectic but fun journey.

Cast 
The actors participating in this film are:

 Alessandra Fuller as Paz
 Andrés Vílchez as Edú
 Jalsen Santana as Wilfredo
 Fausto Mata as Martín
 Joaquín Escobar as Percy
 Guillermo Castañeda
 Leslie Shaw
 Joaquín Escobar
 Cristian Rivero

Production

Script 
The idea for Next to You was conceived during a trip made by the director to Spain to promote Maligno. In brainstorming, the story was constructed as a drama film, but through film assistance it came to be conceived as a romantic comedy.

Filming 
Principal photography lasted 5 weeks in Punta Cana, Dominican Republic.

Reception 
Next to You was seen by 226,360 viewers throughout its run in Peruvian theaters, becoming the tenth highest-grossing national film of 2018.

Awards

References

External links 

 

2018 films
2018 romantic comedy films
Peruvian romantic comedy films
2010s Spanish-language films
2010s Peruvian films
Films set in Peru
Films set in resorts